The Glens Falls Open was a golf tournament on the PGA Tour from 1929 to 1939. It was played at the Glens Falls Country Club in Glens Falls, New York.

Winners
1939 Denny Shute
1938 Tony Manero
1937 Jimmy Hines
1936 Jimmy Hines
1935 Willie Macfarlane
1934 Ky Laffoon
1933 Jimmy Hines
1932 Denny Shute
1931 Billy Burke
1930 Tony Manero
1929 Billy Burke

Former PGA Tour events
Golf in New York (state)
Recurring sporting events established in 1929
Recurring sporting events disestablished in 1939
1929 establishments in New York (state)
1939 disestablishments in New York (state)